National Basketball Association (NBA) games are televised nationally in the United States, as well as on multiple local channels and regional sports networks. Since the 2002–03 season, broadcast channel ABC, and cable networks ESPN and TNT have nationally televised games. Throughout most of the regular season, ESPN shows doubleheaders on Wednesday and Friday nights, while TNT shows doubleheaders on Tuesday and Thursday nights. In the second half of the season, ABC shows a single game on Saturday nights and Sunday afternoons.  Games are shown almost every night on NBA TV.  There are some exceptions to this schedule, including Tip-off Week, Christmas Day, and Martin Luther King Jr. Day.  More games may be shown as the end of the regular season approaches, particularly games with playoff significance. During the playoffs, the first round are split between TNT, ESPN, NBA TV, and ABC on mostly weekends the second round are split between ESPN, TNT and ABC on weekends. The conference finals are split between ESPN/ABC and TNT; the two networks alternate which complete series they will carry from year to year.  The entire NBA Finals is shown nationally on ABC.  The NBA Finals is one of the few sporting events to be shown on a national broadcast network on a weeknight.

Games not televised by its national partners are instead broadcast by local broadcast stations and regional sports networks, televising their respective local team within their respective region. A number of nationally televised games are also non-exclusive, meaning that the national telecasts may also air in tandem with those of the game by local broadcasters.

With the Toronto Raptors being the only NBA team in Canada, TV rights differ in that country. Games exclusively televised south of the border by ABC, ESPN, TNT, and NBA TV may be simulcast by a Canadian network, but all contests involving the Raptors are non-exclusive north of the border.

In addition to the English-language television broadcasts, select NBA games also have Spanish-language broadcasts since 2002.

History
As one of the major sports leagues in North America, the National Basketball Association has a long history of partnership with television networks in the US. The league signed a contract with DuMont in its 8th season (1953–54), marking the first year the NBA had a national television broadcaster. Similar to NFL, the lack of television stations led to NBC taking over the rights beginning the very next season until April 7, 1962—NBC's first tenure with the NBA. After the deal expired, Sports Network Incorporated (later known as the Hughes Television Network) signed up for two-year coverage in the 1962–63, 1963–64 season.

ABC gained the NBA in 1964, the network aired its first NBA game on January 3, 1965, but lost the broadcast rights to CBS after the 1972–73 season with the initial tenure ending on May 10, 1973. Up until the 1970-71 season, ABC often aired NBA games as segments of its popular ABC's Wide World of Sports anthology series rather than standalone broadcasts.

As the national broadcaster of the NBA, CBS aired NBA games from the 1973-74 until the 1989–90 season, during which the late 1970s and early 1980s was notoriously known as the "tape delay playoff era."
Ratings sagged in the late Seventies with a series of fairly undistinguished championship teams from relatively small markets, widespread public perceptions of drug usage among players, and a relative lack of marquee players. Even a merger with the American Basketball Association in 1976, bringing several standout players including Julius Erving into the league, did not reverse the ratings slide. CBS, not wishing to preempt higher-rated regular programming for the relatively low-rated pro basketball, elected to show several playoff games each season tape-delayed into late-night time slots. This situation dramatically improved with the arrival of Earvin "Magic" Johnson and Larry Bird for the 1979-80 season. Beginning with the 1982 NBA Finals, the schedule was shifted to avoid the May television sweeps period, and tape-delayed games were no longer an issue.

NBC then assumed the broadcast rights from 1990 to 2002. During NBC's partnership with the NBA in the 1990s, the league rose to unprecedented popularity, with ratings surpassing the days of Johnson and Bird in the mid 1980s. Upon expiration of the contract in 2002, the league signed an agreement with ABC, which began airing games in the 2002-03 season. NBC had made a four-year $1.3 billion ($330 million/year) bid in the spring of 2002 to renew its NBA rights, but the league instead went to ESPN and ABC with a six-year deal worth $2.4 billion ($400 million/year), a total of $4.6 billion ($766 million/year) when adding the cable deal with Turner Sports. Partially due to the retirement of Michael Jordan, the league suffered a ratings decline after ESPN and ABC took over the rights. The NBA extended its national TV package on June 27, 2007 worth eight-year $7.4 billion ($930 million/year) through the 2015–16 season, during which the league had its new resurgence leading by a renewed Celtics–Lakers rivalry and LeBron James. On October 6, 2014, NBA announced a nine-year $24 billion ($2.7 billion/year) extension with ESPN, ABC and Turner Sports beginning with the 2016–17 season and running through the 2024–25 season - the second most expensive media rights in the world after NFL and on a par with Premier League in annual rights fee from 2016–17 to 2018–19 season.

NBA entered the cable territory in 1979 when USA Network signed a three-year $1.5 million deal and extended for two years until the 1983-84 season, ESPN also had a brief affair with NBA from 1982 to 1984. Turner Sports obtained rights to air NBA games beginning with the 1984-85 season (replacing ESPN and USA Network as national cable partners) under a four-year deal, in which TBS shared the NBA television package along with CBS. In the summer of 1987, Turner Broadcasting System signed a new joint broadcast contract between TBS and TNT to split broadcast NBA games starting from the 1988-89 season. TNT held rights to broadcast the NBA draft, most NBA regular season and playoff games, while TBS only aired single games or doubleheaders once a week. The 2001-02 season would mark the final year of regular NBA coverage on TBS, Turner Sports signed a new NBA television contract in which TNT would assume rights to the company's NBA package while TBS would discontinue game coverage altogether. In recent years however, TBS has served as an overflow feed during the playoffs while also simulcasting the 2015, 2016, and 2017 NBA All-Star Game. Subsequently ESPN regained the NBA in 2002-03 season and took over TBS's half of cable television rights.

Regular season

NBA playoffs

Ever since NBC lost the rights, the Conference Finals have been on cable networks almost exclusively with TNT and ESPN alternating coverage each year.

NBA Finals

Single games

NBA on Christmas Day

Games on Christmas Day have drawn some of the biggest regular season audience. Since 2001, the most watched Christmas games were:

2004 Miami Heat vs Los Angeles Lakers on ABC averaged a 7.3 rating and 13.18 million viewers.

2010 Miami Heat vs Los Angeles Lakers on ABC averaged a 6.4 rating and 13.11 million viewers.

2015 Cleveland Cavaliers vs Golden State Warriors on ABC averaged a 5.7 rating and 11.12 million viewers.

NBA All-Star Game

The NBA All-Star Game was on broadcast networks until 2002, TNT began airing the All-Star Game in 2003 which featured the last appearance of Michael Jordan in the event, TBS started simulcasting the game since 2015.

Regional and Canadian broadcasters

NBA games not televised by its national partners are instead broadcast by local broadcast stations and regional sports networks, televising their respective local team within their respective region. Regionally broadcast games are subject to blackouts, and those games from outside of a viewer's designated market are blacked out to protect the local team.

Certain national telecasts on ESPN, NBA TV and TNT, such as selected regular season matches and first round playoff games, are non-exclusive, and may also air in tandem with telecasts of the game by local broadcasters. However, national telecasts of these games are blacked out in the participating teams' markets to protect the local broadcaster.

As the only team in Canada, the rights to the Toronto Raptors are a special case. Raptors games are split between the national Canadian networks Sportsnet and TSN. The two networks may also simulcast ESPN, NBA TV and TNT televised games, including postseason contests. But all of these U.S. national feeds have been treated as non-exclusive in Canada if they involve the Raptors, inducing the 2019 NBA Finals, allowing the Raptors regional telecast to air in tandem with the U.S. national broadcast.

Most NBA regional broadcasters are members of national chains:

See also
 NBA TV
 NBA TV Canada
 NBA TV Philippines
 NBA League Pass
 List of current National Basketball Association broadcasters
 Major League Baseball on television
 Major League Soccer on television
 National Football League on television
 National Hockey League on television

References

External links
 NBA on Christmas Day numbers game
 NBA All-Star Game TV rating and viewership
 Most watched NBA games on cable networks
 Most watched NBA games since 1998

 
Turner Sports
ESPN
ABC Sports
CBS Sports
Basketball on NBC
USA Network Sports
GMA Network
Solar Entertainment Corporation
Intercontinental Broadcasting Corporation
Radio Philippines Network
ABS-CBN
TV5 (Philippine TV network)
The Sports Network
Sportsnet
CTV Sports
Sky Sports